The Key of Dreams is the second studio album by English post-punk band Section 25, released in 1982 by record label Factory Benelux. It was reissued in 1991 with extra tracks by LTM Recordings.

Reception
Andy Kellman for AllMusic described it as "influenced by dub, Krautrock, and '60s psychedelia (and, yes, probably Joy Division as well)" and "sunken in a glum, mid-tempo pit of dejection." Steve Grant and Ira Robbins in Trouser Press describe it as "nine examinations of paranoia and anxiety, using lurking glissandi, curious touches of Doorsish piano and Oriental philosophy."

Track listing 
All tracks composed by Section 25
Side 1
"Always Now" 	1:50
"Visitation" 	3:22
"Regions" 	3:55
"The Wheel" 	4:07
"No Abiding Place" 	5:25
"Once Before" 	2:48
Side 2
"There Was a Time" 	5:26
"Wretch" 	1:55
"Sutra" 	15:00
Bonus tracks
"The Beast" 8:04
"Sakura" 3:46 produced by Be Music (New Order)
"Je Veux Ton Amour" 5:16 produced by Martin Hannett
"Sakura" (Matrix Mix) 5:23 produced by Be Music (New Order)
"Hold Me" 5:45

References

External links 
 

Section 25 albums
1982 albums
Factory Records albums